Tak Matsumoto Group (often abbreviated as TMG) was a supergroup consisting of members from several bands around the world. It includes Tak Matsumoto, Eric Martin, and Jack Blades. From July to September 2004, it presented its "Dodge the Bullet Tour" of Japan.

After a single, an album, 20 shows and some videos, the band never performed again. In a 2016 interview with Rolling Stone India, Martin said he asked Matsumoto every year about a possible reunion, to which Matsumoto always answered, "Let me think about it".

Lineup 
Official members
 Tak Matsumoto (B'z) – guitar, leader
 Eric Martin (Mr. Big) – lead vocals
 Jack Blades (Night Ranger, Damn Yankees, Shaw/Blades) – bass, backing vocals

Support members
 Brian Tichy (Billy Idol, Ozzy Osbourne, Seether, Whitesnake, Foreigner, Pride & Glory, Glenn Hughes, Sass Jordan, Slash's Snakepit) – studio drums
 Cindy Blackman (Lenny Kravitz) – studio drums
 Chris Frazier (Whitesnake, Foreigner) – live drums

Discography

Albums 
TMG I (June 23, 2004) Oricon ranking: No. 1

Singles 
"Oh Japan (Our Time Is Now)" (March 31, 2004) No. 3

Videos 
Dodge the Bullet (December 15, 2004) No. 8

References 
Notes

Sources
 

Rock music supergroups
Musical groups established in 2004
Japanese hard rock musical groups
Being Inc. artists